Joseanthus cuatrecasasii is a species of flowering plant in the family Asteraceae.
It is found only in Ecuador.
Its natural habitats are subtropical or tropical moist montane forests and subtropical or tropical high-altitude shrubland.
It is threatened by habitat loss.

References

cuatrecasasii
Flora of Ecuador
Endangered plants
Taxonomy articles created by Polbot